Krasnaya Zarya is a rural locality (a settlement) in Kupreyevskoye Rural Settlement, Gus-Khrustalny District, Vladimir Oblast, Russia. The population was 17 as of 2010.

Geography 
Krasnaya Zarya is located on the right bank of the Kolp River, 70 km southeast of Gus-Khrustalny (the district's administrative centre) by road. Kolp is the nearest rural locality.

References 

Rural localities in Gus-Khrustalny District